Jermaine Malaki Wright (born 21 October 1975 in Greenwich) is an English former footballer who played as a midfielder and could also operate as a defender.

Football career
Wright started his career at Millwall as a trainee, but moved to Wolverhampton Wanderers in 1994. At Wolves he scored once; his goal coming in a League Cup tie against Fulham in September 1995. After a loan spell at Doncaster Rovers he joined Crewe Alexandra in February 1998 for a fee of £50,000. At Crewe, his career took off under the guidance of Dario Gradi, who switched him from the right wing to a creative role in the centre of midfield.

In July 1999, after rejecting the offer of a new contract, he was transferred for a fee of £500,000 to Ipswich, where George Burley saw him as a replacement for Kieron Dyer, who had just been sold to Newcastle United. His career thrived under the guidance of Burley but then stalled after he surprisingly opted to move to relegated Leeds United rather than Everton in July 2004.

However, he fell out of favour at Leeds in 2005 and was loaned out first to Millwall (where he had started his career) and then, in January 2006, to Southampton, where he linked up with Burley once more.

After his loan spell ended, he returned to Elland Road where the remaining year of his contract was cancelled by mutual consent. He returned to Southampton for a trial during pre-season training and signed with the club on 10 July 2006 on a two-year deal keeping him at St Mary's until June 2008. He scored his only Saints goal in the 2–1 home defeat by Queens Park Rangers on 30 September 2006.

Wright was released by Southampton on 2 July 2008. During his two years at St Mary's, Wright made exactly 100 appearances, either in midfield or more often at right-back.

On 11 July 2008, Wright signed for Blackpool on a one-year deal with the option of a second. He made his debut for the Seasiders on 9 August 2008 in a 1–0 home defeat to Bristol City. However, he suffered an Achilles tendon injury in his third league match for the club against Sheffield United on 23 August and a month later he underwent an operation which kept him on the sidelines for more than four months and he never managed to establish himself in the side on his return.

On 9 June 2009, Blackpool confirmed that Wright had not been offered a new deal and that he was being released. In July 2010 newly promoted Isthmian League Premier Division side Croydon Athletic signed Wright for the new season. Following allegations that Croydon owner Mazhar Majeed was using the club for money laundering purposes, Wright followed former Crydon boss Tim O'Shea to Lewes in October 2010. Wright played an important role in helping Lewes recover from being adrift in last place but the team fell just short by one point of staying up and Wright retired at the end of the 2010–11 season.

Personal life
Wright is the cousin of former Arsenal star Ian Wright, and played alongside Ian's son, Bradley, at Southampton. Meanwhile, Jermaine's own son, Drey, plays for Hibernian.

Career statistics

Honours
Ipswich Town
Football League First Division play-offs: 2000

Individual
Ipswich Town Players' Player of the Year: 2003–04

References

External links
 
England profile at The FA

1975 births
Living people
Footballers from Greenwich
English footballers
Black British sportspeople
Association football midfielders
Association football defenders
Association football utility players
England youth international footballers
Millwall F.C. players
Wolverhampton Wanderers F.C. players
Doncaster Rovers F.C. players
Crewe Alexandra F.C. players
Ipswich Town F.C. players
Leeds United F.C. players
Southampton F.C. players
Blackpool F.C. players
Croydon Athletic F.C. players
Lewes F.C. players
English Football League players
Premier League players
Jermaine